Nadar can mean:

Pseudonym 
 Nadar, the pseudonym of Gaspard-Félix Tournachon (1820–1910), a French photographer, caricaturist, journalist, novelist, balloonist and proponent of heavier-than-air flight
 The Prix Nadar, an award for a photography book edited in France, named after him

Places
 Nadar, Jaunpur, a village in Uttar Pradesh, India
 Nădar, a village in Spinuș Commune, Bihor County, Romania

Caste
 Nadar (caste), a caste in Tamil Nadu and Kerala

People with the surname
 A. Chidambaranatha Nadar, Indian politician
 A. Y. Arulanandasamy Nadar (1897–1954), Indian politician and philanthropist
 A. Y. S. Parisutha Nadar (1909-1985), Indian politician
 Ayya Nadar (1905–1982), Indian entrepreneur
 K. Kamaraj Nadar (1903–1975), founder and leader of the Indian National Congress
 Kiran Nadar (b. 1951), Indian art collector and philanthropist, wife of Shiv Nadar
 Kunjan Nadar, Indian politician and lawyer
 M. Mayandi Nadar, Indian politician
 Neelalohithadasan Nadar, Indian politician
 P. Thanulinga Nadar (1915–1988), Indian politician, freedom-fighter and activist
 Ponnusami Nadar (fl. 1957–1968), Indian freedom fighter and politician
 R. Ponnappan Nadar (1921-1976), Indian politician
 Roshni Nadar, Indian executive, daughter of Shiv Nadar
 S. S. Mani Nadar (d. 2002), Indian politician
 Shanmuga Nadar (1903–1969), Indian entrepreneur
 Shiv Nadar (born 1945), Indian industrialist and philanthropist
 T. Rattinasami Nadar, Indian founder of Nadar Mahajana Sangam
 T. V. Balagurusamy Nadar (fl. 1903–1921), Indian founder and director of Nadar Bank and president of Nadar Mahajana Sangam
 V. V. Ramasamy Nadar, Indian politician and social activist
 W. P. A. Soundarapandian Nadar (1893–1953), Indian politician

See also
 Amirabad-e Nadar, a village in the Central District of Selseleh County, Lorestan Province, Iran
 Naqiabad-e Nadar, a village in the Central District of Selseleh County, Lorestan Province, Iran
 Nurabad-e Nadar, a village in the Central District of Selseleh County, Lorestan Province, Iran